The 410 is a Canadian drama web series, which premiered on CBC Gem on May 2, 2019. Created by and starring Supinder Wraich, the series centres on Suri, a young Indo-Canadian woman who is drawn into a life of crime after her truck driver father Sahib Rana is arrested for smuggling cocaine.

The series is set in the Indo-Canadian community of Brampton, Ontario, and is named for the city's Highway 410. It was inspired by real-life news stories about Indo-Canadian truck drivers being arrested for drug smuggling, and Wraich created the series because as an Indo-Canadian woman she rarely gets the opportunity to play complex characters who fall short of the idealized image of a stereotypical Asian overachiever.

The series consists of three half-hour episodes, directed by Renuka Jeyapalan.

The series received a Canadian Screen Award nomination for Best Original Web Program or Series, Fiction at the 8th Canadian Screen Awards in 2020.

References

2019 web series debuts
Canadian drama web series
CBC Gem original programming
2019 Canadian television series debuts
Crime drama web series